The College of Engineering Muttathara (In Malayalam - എഞ്ചിനീയറിംഗ് കോളേജ്, മുട്ടത്തറ), (Entrance Commissioner's Code: CEM) is the ninth Engineering College under the Co-operative Academy of Professional Education (CAPE). It was started in 2016 under the Co-operative Academy of Professional Education (CAPE Kerala) Society. The society was formed to establish educational institutions to provide education and training, research and development, and consultancy. The society is promoted by the Co-operation Department of the government of Kerala and is an autonomous society.

The college is located at Muttathara (near St. Sebastian Church, Vallakadavu) of Thiruvananthapuram district. Thiruvananthapuram formerly known as Trivandrum, is the capital city of the Indian State of Kerala. It is the largest and the most populous city corporation in Kerala and the fifth largest urban agglomeration in Kerala. The college is about 4 km from Trivandrum Central Railway Station and very near to Thiruvananthapuram International Airport.

The Courses offered are B.Tech in Civil Engineering, Mechanical Engineering, Electrical & Electronics Engineering, Computer Science & Engineering and Electronics & Communication Engineering. The duration of each course is four academic years as prescribed in the curriculum. The first two semesters will be combined together as first year, and the remaining three years consists of six semesters.

Affiliated university 

The institution is affiliated to APJ Abdul Kalam Technological University.

Admission 

Admission is through Central Counseling by the Government of Kerala. Candidates are admitted based on the state-level Common Entrance Exam (KEAM) conducted by the CEE From 2003.

Courses 

The institution offers B.Tech courses in
 Civil Engineering
 Computer Science & Engineering
 Electronics and Communication Engineering
 Electrical and Electronics Engineering
 Mechanical Engineering

The annual intake for each course

 Civil Engineering - 60
 Computer Science & Engineering - 60
 Electronics and Communication Engineering - 60
 Electrical and Electronics Engineering - 60
 Mechanical Engineering - 60

Location 

The college is located only 3.5 km from heart of the Trivandrum City: East Fort. You can reach the college by bus or by personal vehicle. The college is located only 4 km from Trivandrum Central Railway Station and Trivandrum Airport.

See also 

 List of Engineering Colleges in Kerala

References

External links 
 http://www.capekerala.org/muttathara.html 
 http://www.cemuttathara.org

Engineering colleges in Thiruvananthapuram
Educational institutions established in 2016
2016 establishments in Kerala